San Benedetto is a small, Roman Catholic former parish church, then oratory, located in a piazza of the same name just off the piazza of the Duomo of Florence, region of Tuscany, Italy.

History
The church was founded around the year 1000, but transferred from parish to a confraternity. It was suppressed in 1771, and still retains a chapel with an altarpiece depicting the Miracle of San Zanobi, attributed to Bernardo Veracini.

See also
Zenobius of Florence

References

Roman Catholic churches in Florence